The Market Quarter is an area of Belfast, Northern Ireland, including St George's Market, an area of inner city housing, The Waterfront precinct, a conference and concert hall and the Hilton Hotel.

The area once had 14 markets, but today only St George's Market, built between 1890 and 1896, remains. St George's Market is separated by East Bridge Street from The Market, an area of inner-city housing, which itself is adjacent to a vacant site, formerly the city's Haymarket, and Belfast Central railway station.

References

External links
http://www.belfastcity.gov.uk/stgeorgesmarket/index.asp

Quarters of Belfast